Tazehabad-e Sarab (also Romanized as Tāzehābād-e Sarāb; also known as Tājabal and Tāzehābād) is a village in Sarab Rural District, in the Central District of Sonqor County, Kermanshah Province, Iran. At the 2006 census, its population was 156, in 39 families.

References 

Populated places in Sonqor County